Aston Martin] designed, developed, and produced a custom-made and purpose-built  DOHC turbocharged straight-six engine, with their AMR-One LMP1 prototype race car, in 2011.

Applications
Aston Martin AMR-One

References

Straight-six engines
Aston Martin